Trenton Ashton Wiggan (born 20 September 1962) is a retired footballer who played primarily as a forward. Born in Jamaica, he moved to England as a child and represented his adopted country at schoolboy international level, and played in the Football League for Sheffield United before moving on to a number of clubs in non-league.

Career
Wiggan was a product of Sheffield United's youth system and had appeared for England Schoolboys when made his first team debut as a 16-year-old amateur in August 1979, appearing as a substitute in a League Cup fixture against Doncaster Rovers. Turning professional, Wiggan began to play regularly during the 1980–81 season that saw the Blades relegated from Division Three.  Having started a few games in the early part of the following season, Wiggan soon lost his place and was eventually released in the summer of 1982.

Wiggan joined non-league Gainsborough Trinity where he remained for a year before joining Scarborough in the summer of 1983. Following three seasons with the east coast club, Wiggan had spells at a succession of clubs; Frickley Athletic, a second spell at Gainsborough, Bishop Auckland and Buxton before retiring from playing in 1993.

References

1962 births
Living people
Jamaican footballers
English people of Jamaican descent
English footballers
Association football forwards
Sheffield United F.C. players
Gainsborough Trinity F.C. players
Scarborough F.C. players
Frickley Athletic F.C. players
Bishop Auckland F.C. players
Buxton F.C. players
English Football League players
National League (English football) players
Place of birth missing (living people)